Kunlun Fight (KLF) (Chinese: 昆仑决; pinyin: Kūnlún Jué), is a kickboxing promotion headquartered in Beijing, China. It debuted in 2014 and is regarded as one of the top kickboxing promotions in the world. Events are broadcast on Jiangsu Television domestically and on various regional and international channels.

The first event was held in Pattaya, Thailand on January 25, 2014. The promotion has since held over 20 events each year.

History

Inaugural event
The first event in Pattaya, Thailand on January 25, 2014 included super fights and a 4-man kickboxing tournament with Andrei Kulebin, Petsanguan Luktupfah, Guo Dongwang and Umar Semata. After the inaugural event the promotion has held events in Thailand two more times.

Signing Buakaw Banchamek
On June 7, 2015 it was announced that Kunlun Fight had signed one of the most successful and famous 70 kg kickboxers in history, 2 time K-1 World Max Champion Buakaw Banchamek to an exclusive 6-fight contract. Buakaw has continued fighting in the promotion beyond the original 6-fight contract.

Business
In March 2016, Kunlun Fight finished series B financing from Morningside Ventures, IDG Capital Partners and Northern Light Venture Capital. The round of financing valued the company at over 350 million USD, making Kunlun Fight the most valuable combat sports company in China. Prior to B+ round of financing in Q1 2017 the company was reportedly valued at over 500 million USD.

Multiple Kunlun Fight branded gyms and event venues exist like the Kunlun Fight World Combat Sports Center in Beijing and the Kunlun Fight Stadium in Tongling, Anhui, China.

70 kg tournaments
Kunlun Fight holds a yearly 70 kg world championship tournament.

In 2014 the inaugural 16-man tournament was won by Dzianis Zuev who defeated Victor Nagbe in the final.

For 2015 the tournament was expanded to 64-man and Sitthichai Sitsongpeenong emerged as the champion from a field of fighters including multiple kickboxing champions and highly ranked fighters such as Marat Grigorian, Enriko Gogokhia, Enriko Kehl, Davit Kiria, Murthel Groenhart, Andy Souwer, Yodsanklai Fairtex, Dzhabar Askerov, Superbon Banchamek, Amancio Paraschiv, Chingiz Allazov, Aikpracha Meenayothin and the 2014 tournament winner Dzianis Zuev.

The 2016 tournament was won by Superbon Banchamek, who also beat the winner of the previous tournament Sitthichai Sitsongpeenong in the quarterfinals.

The 2017 tournament champion was Marat Grigorian who beat the 2016 tournament winner Superbon Banchamek in the final.

The 2018 tournament was won by Davit Kiria.

The 2019 tournament was intended to be held on 31 December 2019 in Wuzhishan City, Hainan, China, but was postponed. The tournament was rescheduled for March, 8 in Wuzhishan City, but the event had to be cancelled due to the 2020 coronavirus pandemic ban on live sporting events.

Kunlun Combat Professional League
On September 22, 2018, Kunlun Fight launched a new line of 2nd tier events called Kunlun Combat League. The league has 16 teams and fights are fought in 6 different weight classes. The league events are held mostly at a Kunlun Fight venue in Tongling. 71 KCL events were held during the first qualification season between September 22 and December 31, 2018.

In its present format, the league begins in March with 16 teams split into 2 groups for a regular season. The highest scoring teams from both groups proceed to a knockout phase that culminates with the final event at the end of the year.

In 2019 the league was renamed to Kunlun Combat Professional League (KCPL) and started its first full season on March 16, 2019. The first season was won by team Shenzhen, who beat team Shenyang in the finals held on December 24, 2019 in Yiwu, China.

For the 2020 season, the intended March start date for the league was disrupted by the 2020 coronavirus pandemic. The 2020 season was rescheduled to start in mid-May without live audiences present at the events.

Kunlun Fight City Hero
Started in 2016, a 3rd tier series of events with a mix of professional and amateur fights.

Kunlun Fight Events

Broadcast coverage 
Some current broadcasters include Jiangsu Television in China, Fox Sports Asia and Kix in various countries in Asia, RMC Sport 4, Fight Network and FightBox in multiple countries internationally. Some past broadcasters include Workpoint TV in Thailand, HKSTV in Hong Kong and Taiwan (2016), Anhui Television in China (2017) and Eurosport. In 2017 Kunlun Fight MMA events were broadcast monthly in China on CCTV-5.

Rules
Kunlun Fight mostly holds fights under kickboxing rules, but also under MMA rules. Some Muay Thai, Boxing and Lethwei fights have also been held on Kunlun Fight events.

◾Kickboxing rules: no clinch for survival, active clinch with knees, no throws, no elbows, a yellow card forfeits 25% of the fight purse and earns a 1-point deduction, a red card is a disqualification.

◾Mixed martial arts rules: Unified Rules of Mixed Martial Arts

◾Muay thai rules: knees are allowed to the body, legs and the head, throws and clinch are allowed, elbows are allowed to the body, legs and head, a yellow card forfeits 25% of the fight purse and earns a 1-point deduction, a red card is a disqualification.

Weight classes

Champions

Kickboxing champions

Tournament champions

One night tournament champions

Women's lightweight champions
-60 kg (-132.3 lb)

Muaythai champions

Middleweight championship
-70 kg (-154.3 lb)

MMA champions

Middleweight championship
84 kg (185 lbs); division was formerly 79 kg (175 lbs) until 2017

Welterweight championship
77 kg (170 lbs); division was formerly 75 kg (165 lbs) until 2017

Flyweight championship

Female strawweight championship

Notable fighters

Kickboxing

67 kg (143.3 lb) and under

  Kaew Fairtex
  Wei Ninghui
  Yang Zhuo
  Abdellah Ezbiri
  Fabio Pinca
  Wang Wenfeng
  Tetsuya Yamato
  Ilias Bulaid
  Saeksan Or. Kwanmuang
  Taiga Kawabe
  Lee Sung-hyun
  Massaro Glunder
  Lerdsila Chumpairtour

70 kg (154.3 lb)

  Buakaw Banchamek
  Superbon Banchamek
  Jomthong Chuwattana
  Yodsanklai Fairtex
  Enriko Gogokhia
  Marat Grigorian
  Murthel Groenhart
  Davit Kiria
  Albert Kraus
  Andrei Kulebin
  Wu Xuesong
  Kem Sitsongpeenong
  Sitthichai Sitsongpeenong
  Andy Souwer
  Amansio Paraschiv
  Warren Stevelmans
  Vlad Tuinov
  Dylan Salvador
  Anatoly Moiseev
  Steve Moxon
  Mohamed Mezouari
  Enriko Kehl
  Dzianis Zuev
  Chingiz Allazov
  Dzhabar Askerov
  Aikpracha Meenayothin
  Armin Pumpanmuang Windy Sport
  Tayfun Ozcan
  Cedric Manhoef
  Chris Ngimbi
  Yuichiro Nagashima
  Mustapha Haida

75 - 85 kg (165.3 - 187.4 lb)

  Artur Kyshenko
  Simon Marcus
  Alexander Stetsurenko
  Dmitry Valent
  Vitaly Gurkov
  Alex Pereira
  Israel Adesanya
  Alim Nabiev
  Jason Wilnis
  Hicham El Gaoui
  Too Too
  Bai Jinbin
  Vuyisile Colossa
  Thongchai Sitsongpeenong
  Marc de Bonte

95 kg (209.4 lb) and over

  Andrei Gerasimchuk
  Rico Verhoeven
  Jahfarr Wilnis
  Hesdy Gerges
  Tsotne Rogava
  Felipe Micheletti
  Konstantin Gluhov
  Roman Kryklia
  Sergej Maslobojev
  Tomáš Hron
  Mighty Mo
  Ashwin Balrak
  Virgil Zwicker
  Faisal Zakaria
  Francois Botha
  Sebastian Ciobanu

Women

  Valentina Shevchenko
  Anissa Meksen
  Wang Cong
  Jemyma Betrian
  Ekaterina Vandaryeva

MMA

  Zhang Weili
  Zhang Lipeng
  Jumabieke Tuerxun
  Muslim Salikhov

See also
Kunlun Fight World Combat Sports Center

References

External links

 
Kickboxing organizations
Kickboxing in China
Sports organizations established in 2014
2014 establishments in China
Television in China
Mixed martial arts organizations
Mixed martial arts in China
Entertainment companies of China
Sports organizations of China
Jiangsu Television original programming
China Central Television original programming